Japanese trademark law is mainly enacted by . Under this Act, only registered trademarks establish a "trademark" right (Article 18), and examination procedure is necessary for trademarks to be registered (Article 14). Japan's first modern trade mark law was enacted in 1884. The current Trademark Act was enacted in 1958, and has been amended several times since then.
 

English translation
The definitive version of Japanese law is the text in the Japanese language.  An official English-language translation of the law does not exist, but the Ministry of Justice Japan has the website "Japanese Law Translation", where users can search for Japanese laws and their unofficial English translation. IP laws such as Patent Act, Copyright Act, Trademark Act, Design Act and Unfair Competition Prevention Act are included there.

In addition, J-PlatPat offers the public access to IP Gazettes of the Japan Patent Office (JPO) free of charge through internet.

Reliable information on Japanese IP law in English is also provided by the websites of Intellectual Property High Court, Japan Patent Office, "Transparency of Japanese Law Project", European Patent Office, and Institute of Intellectual Property (IIP) of Japan.

Effects of trademark right

See also 
 Japanese patent law
 Japanese copyright law
 Japanese design law
 Japanese law

References

External links 
 Japanese Law Translation - the website of Ministry of Justice Japan, by which you can search for Japanese laws and their English translation. Intellectual Property laws such as Patent Act, Copyright Act, Trademark Act, Design Act, Unfair Competition Prevention Act etc. are included.
 Intellectual Property High Court in English
 Jurisdiction
 Statistics
 Summary of Cases - You can search for English summaries of IP cases in all the instances.
 Publications - Presentation and theses on IP in English by Japanese judges, and the record of visitors to Intellectual High Court from all over the world.
 Japan Patent Office in English. Handling not only patent and utility model but also design and trademark. The website contains the information on procedures for obtaining those IP rights.
 Examination Guidelines for Trademarks in Japan - detailed information including English summaries of significant court decisions.
 Japanese Copyright Law and Japanese Patent Law - As part of "Transparency of Japanese Law Project", overviews and explanation of Japanese copyright and patent are provided in English. The website of this project also contains information on corporate law, contract law, finance law, insolvency law, arbitration law and civil litigation law in Japan.
 Institute of Intellectual Property (IIP) of Japan in English
 Translated Books  - free access to English translated Japanese famous books regarding Japanese Patent Law and Trademark Law.
 Patent information from Japan - on the European Patent Office web site

Japanese intellectual property law
Trademark law by jurisdiction